Aleksandr Stanislavovich Rudenko (born 4 March 1993) is a Russian former football goalkeeper.

Club career
He made his debut in the Russian Second Division for FC Chernomorets Novorossiysk on 4 August 2013 in a game against FC Olimpia Volgograd.

References

External links

1993 births
Sportspeople from Taganrog
Living people
Russian people of Ukrainian descent
Russian footballers
Association football goalkeepers
FC Chernomorets Novorossiysk players
FC Orenburg players
FC Armavir players
Russian Premier League players
FC Kuban Krasnodar players